Javier Cabada (born October 25, 1931, in Barcelona, Spain) is a Spanish-American artist who paints colorful, abstract works. He has been exhibited in galleries and museums such as the Royal Institute of Thailand in Bangkok, Thailand; the Tretyakov Gallery in Moscow, and the Corcoran Gallery of Art in Washington, D.C.

Background
Cabada was born on October 25, 1931, in Barcelona, Spain. He studied painting at the Escuela Nacional Superior Autónoma de Bellas Artes in Lima, Peru under Oscar Allain Cotera. He also studied at the Corcoran College of Art and Design, and the Ecola Massana in Barcelona. He has lived in the United States since the early 1960s and attained U.S. citizenship in 1976. He currently lives in Washington D.C.

Art
Cabada works almost exclusively as a painter, in acrylic on canvas. He counts Richard Serra, Francis Bacon, Frank Gehry, Jean-Michel Basquiat, and Alberto Giacometti among his artistic influences, not only for their style, but also for their process and perfectionist natures. He experimented with several different styles before settling on acrylic on canvas. His earlier work was considerably more figurative than his later abstract works and was generally cartoonish and whimsical. Many of his early subjects were flowers, dancers, and portraits of classical composers and musicians. From 1973 to 1983, his painting of Frédéric Chopin was on exhibition in the John F. Kennedy Center for the Performing Arts in Washington D.C. and a portrait of Elvis Presley featured on the front cover of  Music Educator's Journal in 1970.

Public collections
Cabada's works are in the following collections:
 Art Institute of Detroit, Detroit, MI
 Museum of Art, Dayton, OH
 Goethe House Museum, Frankfurt, Germany
 Art Institute, Chicago, IL
 Museum of Stafford, Stafford, CT
 Harvard University, Cambridge, MA
 Michigan State University, East Lansing, MI
 University of Alabama, Birmingham, AL
 National Marine Museum, Quantico, VA
 Music Educators and National Conference, Washington, DC
 Cafritz Art Collection, Washington, DC
 John F. Kennedy Center for the Performing Arts, Washington, DC
 Georgetown University, Washington, DC
 Bicentennial Language Incentive Program, Philadelphia, PA
 Army Hospital Walter Reed, Washington, DC
 National Portrait Gallery, Washington, DC
 IBM Art Gallery, New York, NY
 TechWorld, Washington, DC
 Maryland University, MD

References

External links
 Artist's website

1931 births
People from Barcelona
Spanish emigrants to the United States
20th-century American painters
American male painters
21st-century American painters
21st-century American male artists
Spanish painters
Artists from Catalonia
Living people
Spanish portrait painters
American portrait painters
20th-century American male artists